The 25th government of Turkey (5 January 1961 – 20 November 1961) was a government in the history of Turkey. It is also called the Second Gürsel government.

Background 
In 1961  the constituent assembly  of Turkey was formed. Cemal Gürsel the prime minister of the previous government resigned to form a new government to serve together with the constituent assembly.

The government
In the list below, the  cabinet members who served only a part of the cabinet's lifespan are shown in the column "Notes".

Aftermath
The general elections were held on 15 October 1961, and Cemal Gürsel was elected as the new president of Turkey on 26 October 1961. According to the constitution, he resigned as prime minister. After a brief period in which Fahri Özdilek became the acting prime minister, a new civilian government led by İsmet İnönü was formed.

References

1961 establishments in Turkey
Cabinets of Turkey
1961 disestablishments in Turkey
Cabinets established in 1961
Cabinets disestablished in 1961
Members of the 25th government of Turkey
Constituent Assembly of Turkey